Diana López (born January 7, 1984) is an American Olympic Taekwondo competitor from Sugar Land, Texas. She represented the United States at the 2008 Olympics in Beijing, where she won a bronze medal.

Lopez has three older brothers, Steven and Mark who are also Olympians and Jean Lopez who coached Lopez and her other two brothers. Her family is originally from Nicaragua.

In 2005, Diana and her brothers made history by becoming the first three siblings, in any sport, to win World titles at the same event, when they did so at the 2005 World Taekwondo Championships in Madrid, Spain and in 2008, Diana and her brothers made history again by becoming only the second set of three or more siblings to all qualify for the Olympics.

She graduated from Kempner High School in 2002, and is a student at the University of Houston–Downtown. On August 10, 2013, Lopez married strength and conditioning coach of the NBA's Houston Rockets Joe Rogowski.

Competition record

2012  Olympic Trials (57 kg): 1ST
2008  Olympic Games (57 kg): BRONZE
2008  U.S. Olympic Trials (Feather): 1st
2007  Pan Am Olympic Qualifier: SILVER
2007  World Olympic Qualifier: Quarterfinals
2007  Olympic Trials (Bantam/Feather): 1st
2007  World Championships (Feather): BRONZE
2007  Sr. National Team Trials (Feather): 1st
2006  Pan Am Qualifier (Olympic Feather): GOLD
2006  Dutch Open (Feather): BRONZE
2006  Sr. National Team Trials (Feather): 1st
2005  U.S. Olympic Committee Female Athlete of the Month (April)
2005  World Taekwondo Championships GOLD
2005  German Open GOLD
2005  National Team Trials GOLD
2004  Olympic Alternate
2004  Dutch Open GOLD
2004  Senior Nationals BRONZE
2003  National Team Trials GOLD
2002  Brussels Indoor Open GOLD
2002  Dutch Open GOLD
2002  Pan American Championships GOLD
2002  World Cup BRONZE
2002  National Team Trials GOLD
2001  Junior Nationals GOLD
2001  US Open SILVER
2001  Mexico Open GOLD
2001  National Team Trials GOLD
2000  Junior Nationals GOLD
2000  Junior World Championships GOLD
2000  Olympic Team Trials BRONZE
2000  Fight Off for World Cup Team GOLD
2000  Korean Open BRONZE
2000  US Open Sr. Division BRONZE
1999  Junior Nationals GOLD
1998  Junior Nationals GOLD
1998  Junior World Championships GOLD
1998  US Open Jr. Division SILVER
1997  Junior Nationals GOLD
1996  Junior Nationals GOLD
1995  Junior Nationals GOLD
1994  Junior Nationals GOLD
1993  Junior Nationals GOLD
1992  Junior Nationals GOLD
1991  Junior Nationals GOLD

References

External links

1984 births
American female taekwondo practitioners
Living people
Kempner High School alumni
Taekwondo practitioners at the 2008 Summer Olympics
Taekwondo practitioners at the 2012 Summer Olympics
Olympic bronze medalists for the United States in taekwondo
American people of Nicaraguan descent
University of Houston–Downtown alumni
Medalists at the 2008 Summer Olympics
World Taekwondo Championships medalists
21st-century American women